United Skates is a 2019 Emmy nominated documentary film directed by Dyana Winkler and Tina Brown about African American roller skating culture. The film was Executive Produced by John Legend and features Salt-N-Pepa, Coolio and Naughty By Nature.  Acquired by HBO, the film features several notable roller rinks in the United States, including Skate Depot and World on Wheels.

References

External links
 
 United Skates at HBO

HBO documentary films
Roller skating